Lir Kuyu-ye Now (also Romanized as Līr Kūyū-ye Now) is a village in Sadat Rural District, in the Central District of Lali County, Khuzestan Province, Iran. At the 2006 census, its population was 35, in 4 families.

References 

Populated places in Lali County